The 1998 Kansas City Royals season  was a season in American baseball. It involved the Royals finishing 3rd in the American League Central with a record of 72 wins and 89 losses.

Offseason
November 18, 1997: Yamil Benitez was drafted by the Arizona Diamondbacks from the Kansas City Royals as the 19th pick in the 1997 expansion draft.
January 20, 1998: Terry Pendleton was signed as a free agent with the Kansas City Royals.
January 20, 1998: Lee Smith signed as a free agent with the Kansas City Royals.
March 17, 1998: Ernie Young was purchased by the Kansas City Royals from the Oakland Athletics.

Regular season
Before the 1998 regular season began, two new teams—the Arizona Diamondbacks and Tampa Bay Devil Rays—were added by Major League Baseball. This resulted in the American League and National League having fifteen teams. However, in order for MLB officials to continue primarily intraleague play, both leagues would need to carry a number of teams that was divisible by two, so the decision was made to move one club from the AL Central to the NL Central.

This realignment was widely considered to have great financial benefit to the club moving. However, to avoid the appearance of a conflict of interest, Commissioner (then club owner) Bud Selig decided another team should have the first chance to switch leagues. The choice was offered to the Kansas City Royals, who ultimately decided to stay in the American League and bypassing the opportunity to build a full-time rivalry with the St. Louis Cardinals. The choice then fell to the Brewers, who, on November 6, 1997, elected to move to the National League. Had the Brewers elected not to move to the National League, the Minnesota Twins would have been offered the opportunity to switch leagues.

Season standings

Record vs. opponents

Roster

Player stats

Starters by position

Note: Pos = Position; G = Games played; AB = At bats; R = Runs; H = Hits; HR = Home runs; RBI = Runs batted in; Avg. = Batting average; Slg. = Slugging average; SB = Stolen bases

Other batters
Note: G = Games played; AB = At bats; H = Hits; Avg. = Batting average; HR = Home runs; RBI = Runs batted in

Starting pitchers 
Note: G = Games pitched; IP = Innings pitched; W = Wins; L = Losses; ERA = Earned run average; SO = Strikeouts

Other pitchers 
Note: G = Games pitched; IP = Innings pitched; W = Wins; L = Losses; ERA = Earned run average; SO = Strikeouts

Relief pitchers 
Note: G = Games pitched; W = Wins; L = Losses; SV = Saves; ERA = Earned run average; SO = Strikeouts

Farm system

References

1998 Kansas City Royals at Baseball Reference
1998 Kansas City Royals at Baseball Almanac

Kansas City Royals seasons
Kansas
Kansas City Royals